Zurab Samadashvili ((29 January 1955 — 30 August 2021) was a Georgian writer and playwright.

Biography 
Samadashvili was born in Tbilisi on January 29, 1955.

In 1972, he graduated from both the Tbilisi School No. 51 and a music school. In 1977, he graduated from the Faculty of Technology of the Agricultural University of Georgia, specializing in engineering and technology.

Samadashvili's poems were first published in Nobat magazine in 1983 and made their prose debut with the short story Dubliners in the 1986 issue of Mnatobi, No. 7.

In 2010-2012 he was a member of the jury for the Gala (literary prize).

Zurab Samadashvili died in Tbilisi on August 30, 2021.

Works

Books
 Two and a half (poems), editor Dato Akhobadze, Tb. Merani publishing, 1990
 Circle (stories), editor - Lia Sharvashidze, Tb. Merani publishing, 1993
 Wet Brick (novel), Tb. Saari publishing, 1997
 Crazy House (Thriller), Tb. Bakur Sulakauri Publishing House, 1998, 127 pages - ISBN 99928-52-10-0
 Noisy Days (novel), from series - Urban Prose, editor Dato Abuladze, Tbilisi, Saari publishing, 1999 - ISBN 99928-39-10-4
 Axiom (poems), Tb. Merani publishing, 2006
 Drawing lesson (poems), Tb. Glossa Publishing, 2015
 Experiment (stories), Tb. Glossa Publishing, 2015
 Expected Surprises (novel), Tb.  Glossa Publishing, 2015

Drama  
 Behind the Door, 1990
 Circle, 1992
 Orphans (Georgian version of Martin McDonagh's play The Lonesome West), illustrator Alexander Slovinsky, "Our Writing" Magazine, N6 (110) - N7 (111), Tbilisi, 2010. - ISSN: 1987–7730.
 Noisy Days, Giga Lortkipanidze Rustavi Theater, 2016
 Orphans, Sokhumi Theater, directed by Giorgi Kantaria, 2017

Theater 
 Beyond the Door, Sandro Akhmeteli Theater, directed by Alexander Kantaria, 1990
 Circle, Sandro Akhmeteli Theater, directed by Alexander Kantaria, 1992
 Noisy Days Giga Lortkipanidze Rustavi Theater, 2016
 Orphans, Sokhumi Theater, directed by Giorgi Kantaria, 2017

Radio theater  
 Noisy Days, directed by Levan Lortkipanidze, 2002

Literary prizes and awards
 Saba (Literary Award) in the nomination "Best Novel of the Year" for the novel "Expected Unexpected", 2016

References

External links 
 Zurab Samadashvili
 Zurab Samadashvili
 Xmauriani dġeebi
 Samadašvili, Zurab

Writers from Tbilisi
Male writers from Georgia (country)
1955 births
2021 deaths
Writers from Georgia (country)
Novelists from Georgia (country)
Screenwriters from Georgia (country)
Dramatists and playwrights from Georgia (country)
20th-century writers from Georgia (country)
21st-century writers from Georgia (country)
20th-century dramatists and playwrights from Georgia (country)
21st-century dramatists and playwrights from Georgia (country)
Postmodern writers